Gavin Edmund Pretor-Pinney is a British author, known for his books The Cloudspotter's Guide and The Wavewatcher's Companion.

Early life and education
Pretor-Pinney is son of Anthony Robert Edmund Pretor-Pinney and Laura Uppercu, daughter of George Winthrop Haight, of Manhattan, observer for the American Bar Association and a specialist in international law. The Pretor-Pinney family were landowners at Somerton, Somerset since the 1800s, descendants of the sugar merchant and Mayor of Bristol Charles Pinney; Anthony Pretor-Pinney had Somerton Erleigh, named for the family's former house on a different part of the estate, built in 1972–3.

Pretor-Pinney attended Westminster School, the University of Oxford, and Central Saint Martins College of Art and Design.

Career
He co-founded the magazine The Idler and founded the Cloud Appreciation Society in 2004. He grew up in West London and now also lives in Somerton, Somerset.

Awards and honours

2011 Royal Society Winton Prize for Science Books, winner, The Wavewatcher's Companion

Works
The Cloudspotter's Guide (2006)
The Cloud Collector's Handbook (2006)
A Pig with Six Legs and Other Clouds (2007)
The Wavewatcher's Companion (2010)
The Ukulele Handbook (September 2013; co-written with Tom Hodgkinson)
A Cloud A Day (2019)

Television appearances
Presented on BBC TV: Cloudspotting
Appeared on BBC TV: The Secret Life of Waves

References

External links
Cloud Appreciation Society
The Idler magazine

Year of birth missing (living people)
Living people
People educated at Westminster School, London
British magazine founders
British writers